The See Something, Say Something Online Act is a proposed United States law that would require reporting of suspicious transmissions in order to assist in criminal investigations and counterintelligence activities such as international terrorism.

Legislative history

See also 

 List of bills in the 116th United States Congress
List of bills in the 117th United States Congress

References

External links 

Proposed legislation of the 116th United States Congress
Proposed legislation of the 117th United States Congress